Stanisław Łempicki (1886–1947) was a Polish cultural historian, university professor, linguist and writer. He is considered a member of the Lwów–Warsaw school of thought.

1886 births
1947 deaths
Academic staff of Jagiellonian University
Writers from Lviv
University of Lviv alumni
Academic staff of the University of Lviv
Members of the Lwów Scientific Society
20th-century Polish historians
Polish male non-fiction writers
Victims of post–World War II forced migrations
Linguists from Poland
Polish male writers
Burials at Salwator Cemetery
20th-century linguists